James Newton Demaret (May 24, 1910 – December 28, 1983) was an American professional golfer. He won 31 PGA Tour events in a long career between 1935 and 1957, and was the first three-time winner of the Masters, with titles in 1940, 1947, and 1950.

Life and career
Born in Houston, Texas, Demaret reached his peak in the late 1940s with wins in the Masters in 1947, runner-up to Ben Hogan in the 1948 U.S. Open, and leading money winner and Vardon Trophy winner in 1947. He reached the semifinals of the PGA Championship four times, but never made the finals. He was one stroke short of making the playoff for the 1957 U.S. Open, at age 47. He played on three Ryder Cup teams: 1947, 1949, and 1951. His career declined in the 1950s, although he managed several key wins including the 1952 Bing Crosby Pro-Am. His last Tour win came in 1957 at age 47, although he also teamed at age 51 with Sam Snead to win the Canada Cup for the U.S. in Puerto Rico.

Demaret's playing style was developed by necessity through the windy conditions of his native Texas. He favored a low fade (left-to-right flight) on his longer shots; the method gave good distance and excellent control. His skills were highly rated by his contemporaries; Ben Hogan, whose career overshadowed his, opined that he was the best player he had ever seen in windy conditions.

Demaret was known for his flamboyant personality, which he enhanced by wearing bright-colored clothing during tournaments; he had his clothes specially made, and became a fan favorite. As a result, he was known by his nickname, "The Wardrobe." He had a very good baritone voice and talent as a comedian; he frequently entertained at nightclubs at Tour stops.

Demaret was elected to the World Golf Hall of Fame in 1983. In 2000, he was ranked as the 20th greatest golfer of all time by Golf Digest magazine.

Demaret was one of the first Tour pros to become involved in golf broadcasting. After working as a commentator for "All Star Golf" in the early 1960s, he replaced George Rogers in 1966 as co-host for Shell's Wonderful World of Golf with Gene Sarazen, the first winner of the career grand slam.

Business partner and double-major winner Jack Burke Jr. and Demaret started the high-standard 36-hole Champions Golf Club in Houston in the late 1950s. It hosted the 1967 Ryder Cup, the 1969 U.S. Open, the 1993 U.S. Amateur, and other high-profile events.

Demaret appeared as himself in an episode of I Love Lucy titled "The Golf Game" which first aired on January 27, 1954. Fellow golf pro Bo Wininger appeared in the same episode. In 1964, he made a second appearance with Lucille Ball on The Lucy Show. In 1961, he appeared on The Jim Backus Show, playing himself.

The over-70s groupings on the Senior PGA Tour were named the "Friends of Demaret" in his honor.

Death
Demaret died of a heart attack at age 73 in Houston on December 28, 1983, as he was preparing for his daily ride around the Champions course. He was the third of the former Masters champions to pass away, preceded by Horton Smith in 1963 and Craig Wood in 1968.

Professional wins (37)

PGA Tour wins (31)
1938 (1) San Francisco National Match Play Open
1939 (1) Los Angeles Open
1940 (6) Oakland Open, Western Open, New Orleans Open, St. Petersburg Open, Masters Tournament, San Francisco National Match Play Open
1941 (1) Inverness Invitational Four-Ball (with Ben Hogan)
1946 (3) Tucson Open, Miami International Four-Ball (with Ben Hogan), Inverness Invitational Four-Ball (with Ben Hogan)
1947 (6) Tucson Open, St. Petersburg Open, Masters Tournament, Miami Open, Miami International Four-Ball (with Ben Hogan), Inverness Invitational Four-Ball (with Ben Hogan)
1948 (3) Albuquerque Open, St. Paul Open, Inverness Invitational Four-Ball (with Ben Hogan)
1949 (1) Phoenix Open
1950 (3) Ben Hogan Open, Masters Tournament, North Fulton Open
1952 (2) Bing Crosby Pro-Am, National Celebrities Open
1956 (1) Thunderbird Invitational
1957 (3) Thunderbird Invitational, Baton Rouge Open Invitational, Arlington Hotel Open

Major championships are shown in bold.

Source:

Other wins (6)
this list may be incomplete
1941 Argentine Open, Connecticut Open
1943 Michigan PGA Championship, Golden Valley Four-Ball (with Craig Wood)
1951 Havana Invitational
1961 Canada Cup (with Sam Snead)

Major championships

Wins (3)

Results timeline

NT = no tournament
WD = withdrew
DQ = disqualified
CUT = missed the half-way cut
R64, R32, R16, QF, SF = Round in which player lost in PGA Championship match play
"T" indicates a tie for a place

Summary

Most consecutive cuts made – 11 (1941 PGA – 1949 Masters)
Longest streak of top-10s – 6 (1942 Masters – 1947 Masters)

U.S. national team appearances
Professional
Ryder Cup: 1947 (winners), 1949 (winners), 1951 (winners)
Canada Cup: 1954, 1957, 1961 (winners)
Lakes International Cup: 1952 (winners)

See also
List of golfers with most PGA Tour wins

References

External links

American male golfers
PGA Tour golfers
Ryder Cup competitors for the United States
Winners of men's major golf championships
World Golf Hall of Fame inductees
Golf writers and broadcasters
Golfers from Houston
1910 births
1983 deaths